The enzyme sugar-phosphatase (EC 3.1.3.23) catalyzes the reaction

sugar phosphate + H2O  sugar + phosphate

This enzyme belongs to the family of hydrolases, specifically those acting on phosphoric monoester bonds.  The systematic name is sugar-phosphate phosphohydrolase.

Structural studies

As of late 2007, only one structure has been solved for this class of enzymes, with the PDB accession code .

References

 

EC 3.1.3
Enzymes of known structure